Hum Hain Bemisal (transl. We Are Unique) is a 1994 Indian action thriller film directed by Deepak Bahry. It stars Sunil Shetty, Akshay Kumar, Shilpa Shirodkar and Madhoo. The movie is based on the 1989 Hong Kong movie The Killer.

Plot

Tuti Shah murders Kishan to defend his anti-social business and frames Kishan's friend D'Souza for his murder. D'Souza gets life imprisonment. D'Souza's seven-year-old son Michael runs away in frustration when his best friend and Kishan's son Vijay Sinha also expels him for being the son of his father's murderer. Time passes. D'Souza leaves jail and meets the Father of the church. The Father informs him that he could not trace his son Michael, but according to his wish, he had made a Police Inspector of his friend Kishan's son Vijay Sinha, with help of the money he used to send from the jail. D'Souza decides to bring the truth of the murder of Vijay Sinha's father to his knowledge by getting Tuti Shah arrested. At the same time, Tuti Shah learns of deprived Michael and his sympathy and attachment towards the poor. He blackmails Michael emotionally and gets his rival Bakhshi Jang Bahadur killed by Michael. During his attack, a hotel dancer Maria loses her eyesight by the flames of Michael's pistol. Michael himself feels responsible for this accident and without disclosing his identity, starts helping and taking care of Maria. Both fall in love with each other. Now the motto of Michael's life is to get Maria's eyesight back. Tuti Shah again blackmails Michael Dsouza emotionally. He offers him money for the operation of Maria's eyes and asks him to kill another Inspector, Dharam Das in exchange. But in this deal, Tuti Shah deceives Michael. On the other side, Inspector Vijay Sinha is chasing Michael for both the murders and wants to arrest the mafia don Tuti Shah also. To defend a pick pocket Meena from hoodlums, Inspector Vijay Sinha himself falls in love with her. Inspector Vijay Sinha arrests Tuti Shah red-handed, but fails to do anything against him as a lawman. He resigns from his service and decides to eliminate Tuti Shah. Now D'Souza, Michael and Vijay Sinha are on one side and Tuti Shah and his personal army on the other side. Soon on a big climax fight Vijay and Michael overpowers Tuti Shah and kills him. However one explosive bomb is nearby Maria, Michael runs to save Maria, Which he successfully saves her but the bombs explodes causing Michael fatally injured. Michael then tells Vijay to give his eyes to Maria so she can see the whole world again and Dies peacefully. The Movie ends with Maria able to see because of Michael's eye and sees a vision of him and thanks him.

Cast

 Akshay Kumar as Vijay Sinha
 Sunil Shetty as Michael DSouza  as the son of Dsouza   
 Shilpa Shirodkar as Didi
 Madhoo as Maria
 Pran as DSouza as the father of Michael D'Souza
 Iqbal Khan as Kishen as the father of Vijay Sinha
 Rami Reddy as Tuti Shah
 Avtar Gill as Kaliya
 Kunika as Tuti Shah's girl
 Jagdeep as Police constable
 Arun Bakshi as Bakshi
 Vikas Anand as Church Priest/Father
 Gavin Packard as Teju
 Ram Sethi as Hotel Owner

Soundtrack

References

External links
 

1994 films
1990s Hindi-language films
Films scored by Anu Malik
Indian remakes of Hong Kong films
Films directed by Deepak Bahry